The Marriage Laws Amendment Bill is a Bill that was first introduced in the Indian Parliament in 2010. It proposes changes to the Hindu Marriage Act, 1955 and Special Marriage Act, 1954. Both acts has a provision for divorce by mutual consensus of both the parties. The amendment of the marriage laws propose 'irretrievable breakdown' as an additional ground for seeking divorce. Under this provision any marriage party could file a petition for divorce. It grants a wife a share in her husband's inherited and inheritable property. But doesn't give Husband a share in any of his wife's property.

References

Marriage law in India
Hindu law
Marriage in Hinduism
Indian family law
Gender equality
Proposed laws of India
Divorce law